The Musée Adja Swa is a museum located in Abidjan, Ivory Coast.

References

See also 
 List of museums in Ivory Coast

Museums in Ivory Coast
Buildings and structures in Abidjan